Rohan Bopanna and Eric Butorac were the defending champions, but Bopanna did not participate that year.Butorac partnered with Scott Lipsky, but lost in the first round to Denis Istomin and Leonardo Mayer.Bob Bryan and Mike Bryan won in the final 6–4, 7–6(7–2) against Benjamin Becker and Frank Moser.

Seeds

Draw

Draw

External links
 Main draw

Doubles